Barbara Sue Gilders (later Dudeck, born July 23, 1937) is a retired American diver. She competed in the 3 m springboard at the 1956 Summer Olympics and 1959 Pan American Games and finished fourth and third, respectively. Coached by four-time Olympic medalist, Clarence Pinkston, Gilders entered the Olympics as the 1956 AAU champion, and Olympic Trials silver medalist. Later she won the AAU indoor titles in the one-meter (1958) and three-meter springboard (1959).  In June 1959, she won the Pan American Games trials; later that summer, in what would be her final international competition, Gilders won a bronze medal at the Pan American Games.

Personal life
Gilders is the younger sister of Fletcher Gilders, a two-time NCAA diving champion at Ohio State. Fletcher was also a Hall of Fame Diving Coach for Ohio University and three-time NCAA Division III Coach of the Year at Kenyon College. Gilders married John Dudeck, a former swimmer for Michigan State University. A Big Ten Conference record holder and two-time Big Ten titlist in the 100-yard breaststroke (1953 and 54), he was a nine-time All-American for the Spartans (1953–55). Their daughter Diane Dudeck won the national indoor title in the one-meter springboard in 1981; she was also a 1984 NCAA All-American.

References 

1938 births
Living people
Sportspeople from Detroit
American female divers
Olympic divers of the United States
Divers at the 1956 Summer Olympics
Pan American Games bronze medalists for the United States
Pan American Games medalists in diving
Divers at the 1959 Pan American Games
Medalists at the 1959 Pan American Games
21st-century American women